The Frank St. Andrews House is a historic house located in Kaukauna, Wisconsin. It was added to the National Register of Historic Places for its architectural significance on March 29, 1984.

References

Houses completed in 1911
Houses on the National Register of Historic Places in Wisconsin
Houses in Outagamie County, Wisconsin
National Register of Historic Places in Outagamie County, Wisconsin
Bungalow architecture in Wisconsin